Punctelia eganii is a species of foliose lichen in the family Parmeliaceae. It was described as a new species in 2011 by Brendan Hodkinson and James Lendemer. It is named in honor of Robert S. Egan, U.S. lichenologist and professor of biology, who collected the type specimen. The lichen is morphologically identical to Punctelia rudecta, differing only in the production of the secondary metabolite lichexanthone, which was previously unknown in the genus Punctelia. The presence of this compound allows the two species to be distinguished with the use of ultraviolet light, which causes the pseudocyphellae of P. eganii to fluoresce. The type specimen was found in a beech-Magnolia forest in Haines Island Park in Monroe County, Alabama.

References

eganii
Lichen species
Lichens described in 2011
Lichens of the Southeastern United States
Fungi without expected TNC conservation status